"(Sweet Sweet Baby) Since You've Been Gone" is a song by singer Aretha Franklin.  Released from her Lady Soul album in 1968, the song was successful, debuting at number 31 and peaking at number 5 on the Hot 100 for five weeks, and spending three weeks at number 1 on the Hot Rhythm & Blues Singles chart. The B-side, "Ain't No Way", was also a hit, peaking at number 16 on the Billboard Hot 100 and number 9 on the Hot Rhythm & Blues Singles chart.

Cash Box called it a "powerhouse of vocal energy and tingling ork backup to build another emotional blockbuster."

A live recording was featured on the 1968 album Aretha in Paris.

The song was co-written by Franklin and her husband Ted.

Personnel
Aretha Franklin - lead vocals
Jimmy Johnson and Bobby Womack - guitars
Spooner Oldham - Fender Rhodes electric piano
Tommy Cogbill - bass guitar
Roger Hawkins - drums
Melvin Lastie, Joe Newman, Bernie Glow - trumpets
Tony Studd - bass trombone
King Curtis, Seldon Powell, Frank Wess - tenor saxophones
Haywood Henry - baritone saxophone
The Sweet Inspirations, Carolyn Franklin & Erma Franklin - background vocals
horn arrangement: Arif Mardin

Covers

Gary Puckett & The Union Gap released a version of the song on their 1968 album, Young Girl, and the pianist Ramsey Lewis recorded an instrumental version on his 1968 album, Maiden Voyage.

Kate Ceberano released a version of the song on her 1989 album, Brave.

Booker T. and The MG's released a version of the song on their 1968 album, Soul Limbo.

Whitney Houston performed the song in a tribute to Franklin on her 1997 HBO special, Classic Whitney Live from Washington, D.C.. The song was included in a medley with Franklin's "Baby I Love You" and "Ain't No Way".

In 2012, Christine Anu covered the song on her album Rewind: The Aretha Franklin Songbook.

Chart positions

References

External links
[ Song review] at Allmusic

1968 singles
Songs written by Aretha Franklin
Aretha Franklin songs
Gary Puckett & The Union Gap songs
Atlantic Records singles
Song recordings produced by Jerry Wexler
1968 songs